The Han dynasty was an imperial dynasty of China (202 BC – 9 AD, 25–220 AD), established by Liu Bang (Emperor Gao) and ruled by the House of Liu. The dynasty was preceded by the short-lived Qin dynasty (221–207 BC) and a warring interregnum known as the ChuHan contention (206–202 BC), and it was succeeded by the Three Kingdoms period (220–280 AD). The dynasty was briefly interrupted by the Xin dynasty (9–23 AD) established by usurping regent Wang Mang, and is thus separated into two periods—the Western Han (202 BC – 9 AD) and the Eastern Han (25–220 AD). Spanning over four centuries, the Han dynasty is considered a golden age in Chinese history, and it has influenced the identity of the Chinese civilization ever since. Modern China's majority ethnic group refers to themselves as the "Han people", the Sinitic language is known as "Han language", and the written Chinese is referred to as "Han characters".

The emperor was at the pinnacle of Han society. He presided over the Han government but shared power with both the nobility and appointed ministers who came largely from the scholarly gentry class. The Han Empire was divided into areas directly controlled by the central government called commanderies, as well as a number of semi-autonomous kingdoms. These kingdoms gradually lost all vestiges of their independence, particularly following the Rebellion of the Seven States. From the reign of Emperor Wu ( BC) onward, the Chinese court officially sponsored Confucianism in education and court politics, synthesized with the cosmology of later scholars such as Dong Zhongshu. This policy endured until the fall of the Qing dynasty in 1912 AD.

The Han dynasty saw an age of economic prosperity and witnessed a significant growth of the money economy first established during the Zhou dynasty ( BC). The coinage issued by the central government mint in 119 BC remained the standard coinage of China until the Tang dynasty (618–907 AD). The period saw a number of limited institutional innovations. To finance its military campaigns and the settlement of newly conquered frontier territories, the Han government nationalized the private salt and iron industries in 117 BC, though these government monopolies were later repealed during the Eastern Han dynasty. Science and technology during the Han period saw significant advances, including the process of papermaking, the nautical steering ship rudder, the use of negative numbers in mathematics, the raised-relief map, the hydraulic-powered armillary sphere for astronomy, and a seismometer employing an inverted pendulum that could be used to discern the cardinal direction of distant earthquakes.

The Han dynasty is known for the many conflicts it had with the Xiongnu, a nomadic steppe confederation to the dynasty's north. The Xiongnu initially had the upper hand in these conflicts. They defeated the Han in 200 BC and forced the Han to submit as a de facto inferior and vassal partner for several decades, while continuing their military raids on the dynasty's borders. This changed in 133 BC, during the reign of Emperor Wu, when Han forces began a series of intensive military campaigns and operations against the Xiongnu. The Han ultimately defeated the Xiongnu in these campaigns, and the Xiongnu were forced to accept vassal status as Han tributaries. Additionally, the campaigns brought the Hexi Corridor and the Tarim Basin of Central Asia under Han control, split the Xiongnu into two separate confederations, and helped establish the vast trade network known as the Silk Road, which reached as far as the Mediterranean world. The territories north of Han's borders were later overrun by the nomadic Xianbei confederation. Emperor Wu also launched successful military expeditions in the south, annexing Nanyue in 111 BC and Dian in 109 BC. He further expanded Han territory into the northern Korean Peninsula, where Han forces conquered Gojoseon and established the Xuantu and Lelang Commanderies in 108 BC. 

After 92 AD, the palace eunuchs increasingly involved themselves in the dynasty's court politics, engaging in violent power struggles between the various consort clans of the empresses and empresses dowager, causing the Han's ultimate downfall. Imperial authority was also seriously challenged by large Daoist religious societies which instigated the Yellow Turban Rebellion and the Five Pecks of Rice Rebellion. Following the death of Emperor Ling ( AD), the palace eunuchs suffered wholesale massacre by military officers, allowing members of the aristocracy and military governors to become warlords and divide the empire. When Cao Pi, king of Wei, usurped the throne from Emperor Xian, the Han dynasty ceased to exist.

Etymology
According to the Records of the Grand Historian, after the collapse of the Qin dynasty the hegemon Xiang Yu appointed Liu Bang as prince of the small fief of Hanzhong, named after its location on the Han River (in modern southwest Shaanxi). Following Liu Bang's victory in the Chu–Han Contention, the resulting Han dynasty was named after the Hanzhong fief.

History

Western Han

China's first imperial dynasty was the Qin dynasty (221–207 BC). The Qin united the Chinese Warring States by conquest, but their regime became unstable after the death of the first emperor Qin Shi Huang. Within four years, the dynasty's authority had collapsed in a  rebellion. Two former rebel leaders, Xiang Yu (d. 202 BC) of Chu and Liu Bang (d. 195 BC) of Han, engaged in a war to decide who would become hegemon of China, which had fissured into 18 kingdoms, each claiming allegiance to either Xiang Yu or Liu Bang. Although Xiang Yu proved to be an effective commander, Liu Bang defeated him at the Battle of Gaixia (202 BC), in modern-day Anhui. Liu Bang assumed the title "emperor" (huangdi) at the urging of his followers and is known posthumously as Emperor Gaozu ( BC). Chang'an (known today as Xi'an) was chosen as the new capital of the reunified empire under Han.

At the beginning of the Western Han, also known as the Former Han dynasty, thirteen centrally-controlled commanderies—including the capital region—existed in the western third of the empire, while the eastern two-thirds were divided into ten semi-autonomous kingdoms. To placate his prominent commanders from the war with Chu, Emperor Gaozu enfeoffed some of them as kings. 

By 196 BC, the Han court had replaced all but one of these kings (the exception being in Changsha) with royal Liu family members, since the loyalty of non-relatives to the throne was questioned. After several insurrections by Han kings—the largest being the Rebellion of the Seven States in 154 BC—the imperial court enacted a series of reforms beginning in 145 BC limiting the size and power of these kingdoms and dividing their former territories into new centrally-controlled commanderies. Kings were no longer able to appoint their own staff; this duty was assumed by the imperial court. Kings became nominal heads of their fiefs and collected a portion of tax revenues as their personal incomes. The kingdoms were never entirely abolished and existed throughout the remainder of Western and Eastern Han.

To the north of China proper, the nomadic Xiongnu chieftain Modu Chanyu ( BC) conquered various tribes inhabiting the eastern portion of the Eurasian Steppe. By the end of his reign, he controlled Manchuria, Mongolia, and the Tarim Basin, subjugating over twenty states east of Samarkand. Emperor Gaozu was troubled about the abundant Han-manufactured iron weapons traded to the Xiongnu along the northern borders, and he established a trade embargo against the group. 

In retaliation, the Xiongnu invaded what is now Shanxi province, where they defeated the Han forces at Baideng in 200 BC. After negotiations, the heqin agreement in 198 BC nominally held the leaders of the Xiongnu and the Han as equal partners in a royal marriage alliance, but the Han were forced to send large amounts of tribute items such as silk clothes, food, and wine to the Xiongnu.

Despite the tribute and negotiation between Laoshang Chanyu ( BC) and Emperor Wen ( BC) to reopen border markets, many of the Chanyu's Xiongnu subordinates chose not to obey the treaty and periodically raided Han territories south of the Great Wall for additional goods. In a court conference assembled by Emperor Wu ( BC) in 135 BC, the majority consensus of the ministers was to retain the heqin agreement. Emperor Wu accepted this, despite continuing Xiongnu raids. 

However, a court conference the following year convinced the majority that a limited engagement at Mayi involving the assassination of the Chanyu would throw the Xiongnu realm into chaos and benefit the Han. When this plot failed in 133 BC, Emperor Wu launched a series of massive military invasions into Xiongnu territory. The assault culminated in 119 BC at the Battle of Mobei, when Han commanders Huo Qubing (d. 117 BC) and Wei Qing (d. 106 BC) forced the Xiongnu court to flee north of the Gobi Desert, and Han forces reached as far north as Lake Baikal.

After Wu's reign, Han forces continued to fight the Xiongnu. The Xiongnu leader Huhanye Chanyu ( BC) finally submitted to the Han as a tributary vassal in 51 BC. Huhanye's rival claimant to the throne, Zhizhi Chanyu ( BC), was killed by Han forces under Chen Tang and Gan Yanshou at the Battle of Zhizhi, in modern Taraz, Kazakhstan.

In 121 BC, Han forces expelled the Xiongnu from a vast territory spanning the Hexi Corridor to Lop Nur. They repelled a joint Xiongnu-Qiang invasion of this northwestern territory in 111 BC. In that same year, the Han court established four new frontier commanderies in this region to consolidate their control: Jiuquan, Zhangyi, Dunhuang, and Wuwei. The majority of people on the frontier were soldiers. On occasion, the court forcibly moved peasant farmers to new frontier settlements, along with government-owned slaves and convicts who performed hard labor. The court also encouraged commoners, such as farmers, merchants, landowners, and hired laborers, to voluntarily migrate to the frontier.

Even before the Han's expansion into Central Asia, diplomat Zhang Qian's travels from 139 to 125 BC had established Chinese contacts with many surrounding civilizations. Zhang encountered Dayuan (Fergana), Kangju (Sogdiana), and Daxia (Bactria, formerly the Greco-Bactrian Kingdom); he also gathered information on Shendu (Indus River valley of North India) and Anxi (the Parthian Empire). All of these countries eventually received Han embassies. These connections marked the beginning of the Silk Road trade network that extended to the Roman Empire, bringing Han items like silk to Rome and Roman goods such as glasswares to China.

From roughly 115 to 60 BC, Han forces fought the Xiongnu over control of the oasis city-states in the Tarim Basin. The Han was eventually victorious and established the Protectorate of the Western Regions in 60 BC, which dealt with the region's defense and foreign affairs. The Han also expanded southward. The naval conquest of Nanyue in 111 BC expanded the Han realm into what are now modern Guangdong, Guangxi, and northern Vietnam. Yunnan was brought into the Han realm with the conquest of the Dian Kingdom in 109 BC, followed by parts of the Korean Peninsula with the Han conquest of Gojoseon and colonial establishments of Xuantu Commandery and Lelang Commandery in 108 BC. In China's first known nationwide census taken in 2 AD, the population was registered as having 57,671,400 individuals in 12,366,470 households.

To pay for his military campaigns and colonial expansion, Emperor Wu nationalized several private industries. He created central government monopolies administered largely by former merchants. These monopolies included salt, iron, and liquor production, as well as bronze-coin currency. The liquor monopoly lasted only from 98 to 81 BC, and the salt and iron monopolies were eventually abolished in the early Eastern Han. The issuing of coinage remained a central government monopoly throughout the rest of the Han dynasty.

The government monopolies were eventually repealed when a political faction known as the Reformists gained greater influence in the court. The Reformists opposed the Modernist faction that had dominated court politics in Emperor Wu's reign and during the subsequent regency of Huo Guang (d. 68 BC). The Modernists argued for an aggressive and expansionary foreign policy supported by revenues from heavy government intervention in the private economy. The Reformists, however, overturned these policies, favoring a cautious, non-expansionary approach to foreign policy, frugal budget reform, and lower tax-rates imposed on private entrepreneurs.

Wang Mang's reign and civil war

Wang Zhengjun (71 BC – 13 AD) was first empress, then empress dowager, and finally grand empress dowager during the reigns of the Emperors Yuan ( BC), Cheng ( BC), and Ai ( BC), respectively. During this time, a succession of her male relatives held the title of regent. Following the death of Ai, Wang Zhengjun's nephew Wang Mang (45 BC – 23 AD) was appointed regent as Marshall of State on 16 August under Emperor Ping ( AD). 

When Ping died on 3 February 6 AD, Ruzi Ying (d. 25 AD) was chosen as the heir and Wang Mang was appointed to serve as acting emperor for the child. Wang promised to relinquish his control to Liu Ying once he came of age. Despite this promise, and against protest and revolts from the nobility, Wang Mang claimed on 10 January that the divine Mandate of Heaven called for the end of the Han dynasty and the beginning of his own: the Xin dynasty (9–23 AD).

Wang Mang initiated a series of major reforms that were ultimately unsuccessful. These reforms included outlawing slavery, nationalizing land to equally distribute between households, and introducing new currencies, a change which debased the value of coinage. Although these reforms provoked considerable opposition, Wang's regime met its ultimate downfall with the massive floods of  AD and 11 AD. Gradual silt buildup in the Yellow River had raised its water level and overwhelmed the flood control works. The Yellow River split into two new branches: one emptying to the north and the other to the south of the Shandong Peninsula, though Han engineers managed to dam the southern branch by 70 AD.

The flood dislodged thousands of peasant farmers, many of whom joined roving bandit and rebel groups such as the Red Eyebrows to survive. Wang Mang's armies were incapable of quelling these enlarged rebel groups. Eventually, an insurgent mob forced their way into the Weiyang Palace and killed Wang Mang.

The Gengshi Emperor ( AD), a descendant of Emperor Jing ( BC), attempted to restore the Han dynasty and occupied Chang'an as his capital. However, he was overwhelmed by the Red Eyebrow rebels who deposed, assassinated, and replaced him with the puppet monarch Liu Penzi. Gengshi's distant cousin Liu Xiu, known posthumously as Emperor Guangwu ( AD), after distinguishing himself at the Battle of Kunyang in 23 AD, was urged to succeed Gengshi as emperor.

Under Guangwu's rule the Han Empire was restored. Guangwu made Luoyang his capital in 25 AD, and by 27 AD his officers Deng Yu and Feng Yi had forced the Red Eyebrows to surrender and executed their leaders for treason. From 26 until 36 AD, Emperor Guangwu had to wage war against other regional warlords who claimed the title of emperor; when these warlords were defeated, China reunified under the Han.

The period between the foundation of the Han dynasty and Wang Mang's reign is known as the Western Han or Former Han (206 BC – 9 AD). During this period the capital was at Chang'an (modern Xi'an). From the reign of Guangwu the capital was moved eastward to Luoyang. The era from his reign until the fall of Han is known as the Eastern Han or Later Han (25–220 AD).

Eastern Han 

The Eastern Han, also known as the Later Han, formally began on 5 August AD 25, when Liu Xiu became Emperor Guangwu of Han. During the widespread rebellion against Wang Mang, the state of Goguryeo was free to raid Han's Korean commanderies; Han did not reaffirm its control over the region until AD 30. 

The Trưng Sisters of Vietnam rebelled against Han in AD 40. Their rebellion was crushed by Han general Ma Yuan (d. AD 49) in a campaign from AD 42–43. Wang Mang renewed hostilities against the Xiongnu, who were estranged from Han until their leader Bi (比), a rival claimant to the throne against his cousin Punu (蒲奴), submitted to Han as a tributary vassal in AD 50. This created two rival Xiongnu states: the Southern Xiongnu led by Bi, an ally of Han, and the Northern Xiongnu led by Punu, an enemy of Han.

During the turbulent reign of Wang Mang, China lost control over the Tarim Basin, which was conquered by the Northern Xiongnu in AD 63 and used as a base to invade the Hexi Corridor in Gansu. Dou Gu (d. 88 AD) defeated the Northern Xiongnu at the Battle of Yiwulu in AD 73, evicting them from Turpan and chasing them as far as Lake Barkol before establishing a garrison at Hami. After the new Protector General of the Western Regions Chen Mu (d. AD 75) was killed by allies of the Xiongnu in Karasahr and Kucha, the garrison at Hami was withdrawn.

At the Battle of Ikh Bayan in AD 89, Dou Xian (d. AD 92) defeated the Northern Xiongnu chanyu who then retreated into the Altai Mountains. After the Northern Xiongnu fled into the Ili River valley in AD 91, the nomadic Xianbei occupied the area from the borders of the Buyeo Kingdom in Manchuria to the Ili River of the Wusun people. The Xianbei reached their apogee under Tanshihuai (檀石槐) (d. AD 180), who consistently defeated Chinese armies. However, Tanshihuai's confederation disintegrated after his death.

Ban Chao (d. AD 102) enlisted the aid of the Kushan Empire, occupying the area of modern India, Pakistan, Afghanistan, and Tajikistan, to subdue Kashgar and its ally Sogdiana. When a request by Kushan ruler Vima Kadphises for a marriage alliance with the Han was rejected in AD 90, he sent his forces to Wakhan (Afghanistan) to attack Ban Chao. The conflict ended with the Kushans withdrawing because of lack of supplies. In AD 91, the office of Protector General of the Western Regions was reinstated when it was bestowed on Ban Chao.

Foreign travelers to Eastern-Han China included Buddhist monks who translated works into Chinese, such as An Shigao from Parthia, and Lokaksema from Kushan-era Gandhara, India. In addition to tributary relations with the Kushans, the Han Empire received gifts from the Parthian Empire, from a king in modern Burma, from a ruler in Japan, and initiated an unsuccessful mission to Daqin (Rome) in AD 97 with Gan Ying as emissary.

A Roman embassy of Emperor Marcus Aurelius ( AD) is recorded in the Weilüe and Hou Hanshu to have reached the court of Emperor Huan of Han ( AD) in AD 166, yet Rafe de Crespigny asserts that this was most likely a group of Roman merchants. In addition to Roman glasswares and coins found in China, Roman medallions from the reign of Antoninus Pius and his adopted son Marcus Aurelius have been found at Óc Eo in Vietnam. This was near the commandery of Rinan (also Jiaozhi) where Chinese sources claim the Romans first landed, as well as embassies from Tianzhu (in northern India) in the years 159 and 161. Óc Eo is also thought to be the port city "Cattigara" described by Ptolemy in his Geography ( AD) as lying east of the Golden Chersonese (Malay Peninsula) along the Magnus Sinus (i.e. Gulf of Thailand and South China Sea), where a Greek sailor had visited.

Emperor Zhang's ( AD) reign came to be viewed by later Eastern Han scholars as the high point of the dynastic house. Subsequent reigns were increasingly marked by eunuch intervention in court politics and their involvement in the violent power struggles of the imperial consort clans. In 92 AD, with the aid of the eunuch Zheng Zhong (d. 107 AD), Emperor He ( AD) had Empress Dowager Dou (d. 97 AD) put under house arrest and her clan stripped of power. This was in revenge for Dou's purging of the clan of his natural mother—Consort Liang—and then concealing her identity from him. After Emperor He's death, his wife Empress Deng Sui (d. 121 AD) managed state affairs as the regent empress dowager during a turbulent financial crisis and widespread Qiang rebellion that lasted from 107 to 118 AD.

When Empress Dowager Deng died, Emperor An ( AD) was convinced by the accusations of the eunuchs Li Run and Jiang Jing that Deng and her family had planned to depose him. An dismissed Deng's clan members from office, exiled them, and forced many to commit suicide. After An's death, his wife, Empress Dowager Yan (d. 126 AD) placed the child Marquess of Beixiang on the throne in an attempt to retain power within her family. However, palace eunuch Sun Cheng (d. 132 AD) masterminded a successful overthrow of her regime to enthrone Emperor Shun of Han ( AD). Yan was placed under house arrest, her relatives were either killed or exiled, and her eunuch allies were slaughtered. The regent Liang Ji (d. 159 AD), brother of Empress Liang Na (d. 150 AD), had the brother-in-law of Consort Deng Mengnü (later empress) (d. 165 AD) killed after Deng Mengnü resisted Liang Ji's attempts to control her. Afterward, Emperor Huan employed eunuchs to depose Liang Ji, who was then forced to commit suicide.

Students from the Imperial University organized a widespread student protest against the eunuchs of Emperor Huan's court. Huan further alienated the bureaucracy when he initiated grandiose construction projects and hosted thousands of concubines in his harem at a time of economic crisis. Palace eunuchs imprisoned the official Li Ying and his associates from the Imperial University on a dubious charge of treason. In 167 AD, the Grand Commandant Dou Wu (d. 168 AD) convinced his son-in-law, Emperor Huan, to release them. However the emperor permanently barred Li Ying and his associates from serving in office, marking the beginning of the Partisan Prohibitions.

Following Huan's death, Dou Wu and the Grand Tutor Chen Fan (d. 168 AD) attempted a coup d'état against the eunuchs Hou Lan (d. 172 AD), Cao Jie (d. 181 AD), and Wang Fu. When the plot was uncovered, the eunuchs arrested Empress Dowager Dou (d. 172 AD) and Chen Fan. General Zhang Huan favored the eunuchs. He and his troops confronted Dou Wu and his retainers at the palace gate where each side shouted accusations of treason against the other. When the retainers gradually deserted Dou Wu, he was forced to commit suicide.

Under Emperor Ling ( AD) the eunuchs had the partisan prohibitions renewed and expanded, while also auctioning off top government offices. Many affairs of state were entrusted to the eunuchs Zhao Zhong (d. 189 AD) and Zhang Rang (d. 189 AD) while Emperor Ling spent much of his time roleplaying with concubines and participating in military parades.

End of the Han dynasty

The Partisan Prohibitions were repealed during the Yellow Turban Rebellion and Five Pecks of Rice Rebellion in 184 AD, largely because the court did not want to continue to alienate a significant portion of the gentry class who might otherwise join the rebellions. The Yellow Turbans and Five-Pecks-of-Rice adherents belonged to two different hierarchical Daoist religious societies led by faith healers Zhang Jue (d. 184 AD) and Zhang Lu (d. 216 AD), respectively. 

Zhang Lu's rebellion, in modern northern Sichuan and southern Shaanxi, was not quelled until 215 AD. Zhang Jue's massive rebellion across eight provinces was annihilated by Han forces within a year, however the following decades saw much smaller recurrent uprisings. Although the Yellow Turbans were defeated, many generals appointed during the crisis never disbanded their assembled militia forces and used these troops to amass power outside of the collapsing imperial authority.

General-in-Chief He Jin (d. 189 AD), half-brother to Empress He (d. 189 AD), plotted with Yuan Shao (d. 202 AD) to overthrow the eunuchs by having several generals march to the outskirts of the capital. There, in a written petition to Empress He, they demanded the eunuchs' execution. After a period of hesitation, Empress He consented. When the eunuchs discovered this, however, they had her brother He Miao rescind the order. The eunuchs assassinated He Jin on September 22, 189 AD. 

Yuan Shao then besieged Luoyang's Northern Palace while his brother Yuan Shu (d. 199 AD) besieged the Southern Palace. On September 25 both palaces were breached and approximately two thousand eunuchs were killed. Zhang Rang had previously fled with Emperor Shao ( AD) and his brother Liu Xie—the future Emperor Xian of Han ( AD). While being pursued by the Yuan brothers, Zhang committed suicide by jumping into the Yellow River.

General Dong Zhuo (d. 192 AD) found the young emperor and his brother wandering in the countryside. He escorted them safely back to the capital and was made Minister of Works, taking control of Luoyang and forcing Yuan Shao to flee. After Dong Zhuo demoted Emperor Shao and promoted his brother Liu Xie as Emperor Xian, Yuan Shao led a coalition of former officials and officers against Dong, who burned Luoyang to the ground and resettled the court at Chang'an in May 191 AD. Dong Zhuo later poisoned Emperor Shao.

Dong was killed by his adopted son Lü Bu (d. 198 AD) in a plot hatched by Wang Yun (d. 192 AD). Emperor Xian fled from Chang'an in 195 AD to the ruins of Luoyang. Xian was persuaded by Cao Cao (155–220 AD), then Governor of Yan Province in modern western Shandong and eastern Henan, to move the capital to Xuchang in 196 AD.

Yuan Shao challenged Cao Cao for control over the emperor. Yuan's power was greatly diminished after Cao defeated him at the Battle of Guandu in 200 AD. After Yuan died, Cao killed Yuan Shao's son Yuan Tan (173–205 AD), who had fought with his brothers over the family inheritance. His brothers Yuan Shang and Yuan Xi were killed in 207 AD by Gongsun Kang (d. 221 AD), who sent their heads to Cao Cao.

After Cao's defeat at the naval Battle of Red Cliffs in 208 AD, China was divided into three spheres of influence, with Cao Cao dominating the north, Sun Quan (182–252 AD) dominating the south, and Liu Bei (161–223 AD) dominating the west. Cao Cao died in March 220 AD. By December his son Cao Pi (187–226 AD) had Emperor Xian relinquish the throne to him and is known posthumously as Emperor Wen of Wei. This formally ended the Han dynasty and initiated an age of conflict between three states: Cao Wei, Eastern Wu, and Shu Han.

Culture and society

Social class

In the hierarchical social order, the emperor was at the apex of Han society and government. However, the emperor was often a minor, ruled over by a regent such as the empress dowager or one of her male relatives. Ranked immediately below the emperor were the kings who were of the same Liu family clan. The rest of society, including nobles lower than kings and all commoners excluding slaves, belonged to one of twenty ranks (ershi gongcheng ).

Each successive rank gave its holder greater pensions and legal privileges. The highest rank, of full marquess, came with a state pension and a territorial fiefdom. Holders of the rank immediately below, that of ordinary marquess, received a pension, but had no territorial rule. Officials who served in government belonged to the wider commoner social class and were ranked just below nobles in social prestige. The highest government officials could be enfeoffed as marquesses. 

By the Eastern Han period, local elites of unattached scholars, teachers, students, and government officials began to identify themselves as members of a larger, nationwide gentry class with shared values and a commitment to mainstream scholarship. When the government became noticeably corrupt in mid-to-late Eastern Han, many gentrymen even considered the cultivation of morally-grounded personal relationships more important than serving in public office.

The farmer, or specifically the small landowner-cultivator, was ranked just below scholars and officials in the social hierarchy. Other agricultural cultivators were of a lower status, such as tenants, wage laborers, and slaves. The Han dynasty made adjustments to slavery in China and saw an increase in agricultural slaves. Artisans, technicians, tradespeople, and craftsmen had a legal and socioeconomic status between that of owner-cultivator farmers and common merchants. 

State-registered merchants, who were forced by law to wear white-colored clothes and pay high commercial taxes, were considered by the gentry as social parasites with a contemptible status. These were often petty shopkeepers of urban marketplaces; merchants such as industrialists and itinerant traders working between a network of cities could avoid registering as merchants and were often wealthier and more powerful than the vast majority of government officials.

Wealthy landowners, such as nobles and officials, often provided lodging for retainers who provided valuable work or duties, sometimes including fighting bandits or riding into battle. Unlike slaves, retainers could come and go from their master's home as they pleased. Medical physicians, pig breeders, and butchers had a fairly high social status, while occultist diviners, runners, and messengers had low status.

Marriage, gender, and kinship

The Han-era family was patrilineal and typically had four to five nuclear family members living in one household. Multiple generations of extended family members did not occupy the same house, unlike families of later dynasties. According to Confucian family norms, various family members were treated with different levels of respect and intimacy. For example, there were different accepted time frames for mourning the death of a father versus a paternal uncle.

Marriages were highly ritualized, particularly for the wealthy, and included many important steps. The giving of betrothal gifts, known as bridewealth and dowry, were especially important. A lack of either was considered dishonorable and the woman would have been seen not as a wife, but as a concubine. Arranged marriages were normal, with the father's input on his offspring's spouse being considered more important than the mother's.

Monogamous marriages were also normal, although nobles and high officials were wealthy enough to afford and support concubines as additional lovers. Under certain conditions dictated by custom, not law, both men and women were able to divorce their spouses and remarry. However, a woman who had been widowed continued to belong to her husband's family after his death. In order to remarry, the widow would have to be returned to her family in exchange for a ransom fee. Her children would not be allowed to go with her.

Apart from the passing of noble titles or ranks, inheritance practices did not involve primogeniture; each son received an equal share of the family property. Unlike the practice in later dynasties, the father usually sent his adult married sons away with their portions of the family fortune. Daughters received a portion of the family fortune through their marriage dowries, though this was usually much less than the shares of sons. A different distribution of the remainder could be specified in a will, but it is unclear how common this was.

Women were expected to obey the will of their father, then their husband, and then their adult son in old age. However, it is known from contemporary sources that there were many deviations to this rule, especially in regard to mothers over their sons, and empresses who ordered around and openly humiliated their fathers and brothers. Women were exempt from the annual corvée labor duties, but often engaged in a range of income-earning occupations aside from their domestic chores of cooking and cleaning.

The most common occupation for women was weaving clothes for the family, for sale at market, or for large textile enterprises that employed hundreds of women. Other women helped on their brothers' farms or became singers, dancers, sorceresses, respected medical physicians, and successful merchants who could afford their own silk clothes. Some women formed spinning collectives, aggregating the resources of several different families.

Education, literature, and philosophy

The early Western Han court simultaneously accepted the philosophical teachings of Legalism, Huang-Lao Daoism, and Confucianism in making state decisions and shaping government policy. However, the Han court under Emperor Wu gave Confucianism exclusive patronage. He abolished all academic chairs or erudites (bóshì 博士) not dealing with the Confucian Five Classics in 136 BCE and encouraged nominees for office to receive a Confucian-based education at the Imperial University that he established in 124 BCE. 

Unlike the original ideology espoused by Confucius, or Kongzi (551–479 BCE), Han Confucianism in Emperor Wu's reign was the creation of Dong Zhongshu (179–104 BCE). Dong was a scholar and minor official who aggregated the ethical Confucian ideas of ritual, filial piety, and harmonious relationships with five phases and yin-yang cosmologies. Much to the interest of the ruler, Dong's synthesis justified the imperial system of government within the natural order of the universe. 

The Imperial University grew in importance as the student body grew to over 30,000 by the 2nd century CE. A Confucian-based education was also made available at commandery-level schools and private schools opened in small towns, where teachers earned respectable incomes from tuition payments. Schools were established in far southern regions where standard Chinese texts were used to assimilate the local populace.

Some important texts were created and studied by scholars. Philosophical works written by Yang Xiong (53 BCE – 18 CE), Huan Tan (43 BCE – 28 CE), Wang Chong (27–100 CE), and Wang Fu (78–163 CE) questioned whether human nature was innately good or evil and posed challenges to Dong's universal order. The Records of the Grand Historian by Sima Tan (d. 110 BCE) and his son Sima Qian (145–86 BCE) established the standard model for all of imperial China's Standard Histories, such as the Book of Han written by Ban Biao (3–54 CE), his son Ban Gu (32–92 CE), and his daughter Ban Zhao (45–116 CE). There were dictionaries such as the Shuowen Jiezi by Xu Shen ( –  CE) and the Fangyan by Yang Xiong.

Biographies on important figures were written by various gentrymen. Han dynasty poetry was dominated by the fu genre, which achieved its greatest prominence during the reign of Emperor Wu.

Law and order

Han scholars such as Jia Yi (201–169 BCE) portrayed the previous Qin dynasty as a brutal regime. However, archeological evidence from Zhangjiashan and Shuihudi reveal that many of the statutes in the Han law code compiled by Chancellor Xiao He (d. 193 BCE) were derived from Qin law.

Various cases for rape, physical abuse, and murder were prosecuted in court. Women, although usually having fewer rights by custom, were allowed to level civil and criminal charges against men. While suspects were jailed, convicted criminals were never imprisoned. Instead, punishments were commonly monetary fines, periods of forced hard labor for convicts, and the penalty of death by beheading. Early Han punishments of torturous mutilation were borrowed from Qin law. A series of reforms abolished mutilation punishments with progressively less-severe beatings by the bastinado.

Acting as a judge in lawsuits was one of the many duties of the county magistrate and Administrators of commanderies. Complex, high-profile, or unresolved cases were often deferred to the Minister of Justice in the capital or even the emperor. In each Han county was several districts, each overseen by a chief of police. Order in the cities was maintained by government officers in the marketplaces and constables in the neighborhoods.

Food

The most common staple crops consumed during Han were wheat, barley, foxtail millet, proso millet, rice, and beans. Commonly eaten fruits and vegetables included chestnuts, pears, plums, peaches, melons, apricots, strawberries, red bayberries, jujubes, calabash, bamboo shoots, mustard plant, and taro. Domesticated animals that were also eaten included chickens, Mandarin ducks, geese, cows, sheep, pigs, camels, and dogs (various types were bred specifically for food, while most were used as pets). Turtles and fish were taken from streams and lakes. Commonly hunted game, such as owl, pheasant, magpie, sika deer, and Chinese bamboo partridge were consumed. Seasonings included sugar, honey, salt, and soy sauce. Beer and wine were regularly consumed.

Clothing

The types of clothing worn and the materials used during the Han period depended upon social class. Wealthy folk could afford silk robes, skirts, socks, and mittens, coats made of badger or fox fur, duck plumes, and slippers with inlaid leather, pearls, and silk lining. Peasants commonly wore clothes made of hemp, wool, and ferret skins.

Religion, cosmology, and metaphysics

Families throughout Han China made ritual sacrifices of animals and food to deities, spirits, and ancestors at temples and shrines. They believed that these items could be used by those in the spiritual realm. It was thought that each person had a two-part soul: the spirit-soul (hun 魂) which journeyed to the afterlife paradise of immortals (xian), and the body-soul (po 魄) which remained in its grave or tomb on earth and was only reunited with the spirit-soul through a ritual ceremony.

In addition to his many other roles, the emperor acted as the highest priest in the land who made sacrifices to Heaven, the main deities known as the Five Powers, and the spirits (shen 神) of mountains and rivers. It was believed that the three realms of Heaven, Earth, and Mankind were linked by natural cycles of yin and yang and the five phases. If the emperor did not behave according to proper ritual, ethics, and morals, he could disrupt the fine balance of these cosmological cycles and cause calamities such as earthquakes, floods, droughts, epidemics, and swarms of locusts.

It was believed that immortality could be achieved if one reached the lands of the Queen Mother of the West or Mount Penglai. Han-era Daoists assembled into small groups of hermits who attempted to achieve immortality through breathing exercises, sexual techniques, and the use of medical elixirs. 

By the 2nd century CE, Daoists formed large hierarchical religious societies such as the Way of the Five Pecks of Rice. Its followers believed that the sage-philosopher Laozi was a holy prophet who would offer salvation and good health if his devout followers would confess their sins, ban the worship of unclean gods who accepted meat sacrifices, and chant sections of the Daodejing.

Buddhism first entered Imperial China through the Silk Road during the Eastern Han, and was first mentioned in 65 CE. Liu Ying (d. 71 CE), a half-brother to Emperor Ming of Han ( CE), was one of its earliest Chinese adherents, although Chinese Buddhism at this point was heavily associated with Huang-Lao Daoism. China's first known Buddhist temple, the White Horse Temple, was constructed outside the wall of the capital, Luoyang, during Emperor Ming's reign. Important Buddhist canons were translated into Chinese during the 2nd century CE, including the Sutra of Forty-two Chapters, Perfection of Wisdom, Shurangama Sutra, and Pratyutpanna Sutra.

Government and politics

Central government

In Han government, the emperor was the supreme judge and lawgiver, the commander-in-chief of the armed forces and sole designator of official nominees appointed to the top posts in central and local administrations; those who earned a 600-bushel salary-rank or higher. Theoretically, there were no limits to his power. 

However, state organs with competing interests and institutions such as the court conference (tíngyì )—where ministers were convened to reach majority consensus on an issue—pressured the emperor to accept the advice of his ministers on policy decisions. If the emperor rejected a court conference decision, he risked alienating his high ministers. Nevertheless, emperors sometimes did reject the majority opinion reached at court conferences.

Below the emperor were his cabinet members known as the Three Councilors of State (Sān gōng ). These were the Chancellor or Minister over the Masses (Chéngxiāng  or Dà sìtú ), the Imperial Counselor or Excellency of Works (Yùshǐ dàfū  or Dà sìkōng ), and Grand Commandant or Grand Marshal (Tàiwèi  or Dà sīmǎ ).

The Chancellor, whose title was changed to 'Minister over the Masses' in 8 BC, was chiefly responsible for drafting the government budget. The Chancellor's other duties included managing provincial registers for land and population, leading court conferences, acting as judge in lawsuits, and recommending nominees for high office. He could appoint officials below the salary-rank of 600 bushels.

The Imperial Counselor's chief duty was to conduct disciplinary procedures for officials. He shared similar duties with the Chancellor, such as receiving annual provincial reports. However, when his title was changed to Minister of Works in 8 BC, his chief duty became the oversight of public works projects.

The Grand Commandant, whose title was changed to Grand Marshal in 119 BC before reverting to Grand Commandant in 51 AD, was the irregularly posted commander of the military and then regent during the Western Han period. In the Eastern Han era he was chiefly a civil official who shared many of the same censorial powers as the other two Councilors of State.

Ranked below the Three Councilors of State were the Nine Ministers (Jiǔ qīng ), who each headed a specialized ministry. The Minister of Ceremonies (Tàicháng ) was the chief official in charge of religious rites, rituals, prayers, and the maintenance of ancestral temples and altars. The Minister of the Household (Guāng lù xūn ) was in charge of the emperor's security within the palace grounds, external imperial parks, and wherever the emperor made an outing by chariot.

The Minister of the Guards (Wèiwèi ) was responsible for securing and patrolling the walls, towers, and gates of the imperial palaces. The Minister Coachman (Tàipú ) was responsible for the maintenance of imperial stables, horses, carriages, and coach-houses for the emperor and his palace attendants, as well as the supply of horses for the armed forces. The Minister of Justice (Tíngwèi ) was the chief official in charge of upholding, administering, and interpreting the law. The Minister Herald (Dà hónglú ) was the chief official in charge of receiving honored guests at the imperial court, such as nobles and foreign ambassadors.

The Minister of the Imperial Clan (Zōngzhèng ) oversaw the imperial court's interactions with the empire's nobility and extended imperial family, such as granting fiefs and titles. The Minister of Finance (Dà sìnóng ) was the treasurer for the official bureaucracy and the armed forces who handled tax revenues and set standards for units of measurement. The Minister Steward (Shǎofǔ ) served the emperor exclusively, providing him with entertainment and amusements, proper food and clothing, medicine and physical care, valuables and equipment.

Local government

The Han empire, excluding kingdoms and marquessates, was divided, in descending order of size, into political units of provinces, commanderies, and counties. A county was divided into several districts (xiang 鄉), the latter composed of a group of hamlets (li 里), each containing about a hundred families.

The heads of provinces, whose official title was changed from Inspector to Governor and vice versa several times during Han, were responsible for inspecting several commandery-level and kingdom-level administrations. On the basis of their reports, the officials in these local administrations would be promoted, demoted, dismissed, or prosecuted by the imperial court.

A governor could take various actions without permission from the imperial court. The lower-ranked inspector had executive powers only during times of crisis, such as raising militias across the commanderies under his jurisdiction to suppress a rebellion.

A commandery consisted of a group of counties, and was headed by an Administrator. He was the top civil and military leader of the commandery and handled defense, lawsuits, seasonal instructions to farmers, and recommendations of nominees for office sent annually to the capital in a quota system first established by Emperor Wu. The head of a large county of about 10,000 households was called a Prefect, while the heads of smaller counties were called Chiefs, and both could be referred to as Magistrates. A Magistrate maintained law and order in his county, registered the populace for taxation, mobilized commoners for annual corvée duties, repaired schools, and supervised public works.

Kingdoms and marquessates

Kingdoms—roughly the size of commanderies—were ruled exclusively by the emperor's male relatives as semi-autonomous fiefdoms. Before 157 BC some kingdoms were ruled by non-relatives, granted to them in return for their services to Emperor Gaozu. The administration of each kingdom was very similar to that of the central government. Although the emperor appointed the Chancellor of each kingdom, kings appointed all the remaining civil officials in their fiefs.

However, in 145 BC, after several insurrections by the kings, Emperor Jing removed the kings' rights to appoint officials whose salaries were higher than 400 bushels. The Imperial Counselors and Nine Ministers (excluding the Minister Coachman) of every kingdom were abolished, although the Chancellor was still appointed by the central government.

With these reforms, kings were reduced to being nominal heads of their fiefs, gaining a personal income from only a portion of the taxes collected in their kingdom. Similarly, the officials in the administrative staff of a full marquess's fief were appointed by the central government. A marquess's Chancellor was ranked as the equivalent of a county Prefect. Like a king, the marquess collected a portion of the tax revenues in his fief as personal income.

Up until the reign of Emperor Jing of Han, the Emperors of the Han had great difficulty bringing the vassal kings under control, as kings often switched their allegiance to the Xiongnu Chanyu whenever threatened by Imperial attempts to centralize power. Within the seven years of Han Gaozu's reign, three vassal kings and one marquess either defected to or allied with the Xiongnu. Even imperial princes in control of fiefdoms would sometimes invite the Xiongnu to invade in response to threats by the Emperor to remove their power. The Han emperors moved to secure a treaty with the Chanyu to demarcate authority between them, recognizing each other as the "two masters" (兩主), the sole representatives of their respective peoples, and cemented it with a marriage alliance (heqin), before eliminating the rebellious vassal kings in 154 BC. This prompted some vassal kings of the Xiongnu to switch their allegiance to the Han emperor from 147 BC. Han court officials were initially hostile to the idea of disrupting the status quo and expanding into the Xiongnu steppe territory. The surrendered Xiongnu were integrated into a parallel military and political structure under the Han Emperor, and opened the avenue for the Han dynasty to challenge the Xiongnu cavalry on the steppe. This also introduced the Han to the interstate networks in the Tarim Basin (Xinjiang), allowing for the expansion of the Han dynasty from a limited regional state to a universalist and cosmopolitan empire through further marriage alliances with another steppe power, the Wusun.

Military

At the beginning of the Han dynasty, every male commoner aged twenty-three was liable for conscription into the military. The minimum age for the military draft was reduced to twenty after Emperor Zhao's ( BC) reign. Conscripted soldiers underwent one year of training and one year of service as non-professional soldiers. The year of training was served in one of three branches of the armed forces: infantry, cavalry, or navy. Soldiers who completed their term of service still needed to train to maintain their skill because they were subject to annual military readiness inspections and could be called up for future service - until this practice was discontinued after 30 AD with the abolishment of much of the conscription system.  The year of active service was served either on the frontier, in a king's court, or under the Minister of the Guards in the capital. A small professional (full time career) standing army was stationed near the capital.

During the Eastern Han, conscription could be avoided if one paid a commutable tax. The Eastern Han court favored the recruitment of a volunteer army. The volunteer army comprised the Southern Army (Nanjun 南軍), while the standing army stationed in and near the capital was the Northern Army (Beijun 北軍). Led by Colonels (Xiaowei 校尉), the Northern Army consisted of five regiments, each composed of several thousand soldiers. When central authority collapsed after 189 AD, wealthy landowners, members of the aristocracy/nobility, and regional military-governors relied upon their retainers to act as their own personal troops. The latter were known as  部曲, a special social class in Chinese history.

During times of war, the volunteer army was increased, and a much larger militia was raised across the country to supplement the Northern Army. In these circumstances, a General (Jiangjun 將軍) led a division, which was divided into regiments led by Colonels and sometimes Majors (Sima 司馬). Regiments were divided into companies and led by Captains. Platoons were the smallest units of soldiers.

Economy

Currency

The Han dynasty inherited the ban liang coin type from the Qin. In the beginning of the Han, Emperor Gaozu closed the government mint in favor of private minting of coins. This decision was reversed in 186 BC by his widow Grand Empress Dowager Lü Zhi (d. 180 BC), who abolished private minting. In 182 BC, Lü Zhi issued a bronze coin that was much lighter in weight than previous coins. This caused widespread inflation that was not reduced until 175 BC when Emperor Wen allowed private minters to manufacture coins that were precisely 2.6 g (0.09 oz) in weight.

In 144 BC Emperor Jing abolished private minting in favor of central-government and commandery-level minting; he also introduced a new coin. Emperor Wu introduced another in 120 BC, but a year later he abandoned the ban liangs entirely in favor of the wuzhu (五銖) coin, weighing 3.2 g (0.11 oz). The wuzhu became China's standard coin until the Tang dynasty (618–907 AD). Its use was interrupted briefly by several new currencies introduced during Wang Mang's regime until it was reinstated in 40 AD by Emperor Guangwu.

Since commandery-issued coins were often of inferior quality and lighter weight, the central government closed commandery mints and monopolized the issue of coinage in 113 BC. This central government issuance of coinage was overseen by the Superintendent of Waterways and Parks, this duty being transferred to the Minister of Finance during the Eastern Han.

Taxation and property

Aside from the landowner's land tax paid in a portion of their crop yield, the poll tax and property taxes were paid in coin cash. The annual poll tax rate for adult men and women was 120 coins and 20 coins for minors. Merchants were required to pay a higher rate of 240 coins. The poll tax stimulated a money economy that necessitated the minting of over 28,000,000,000 coins from 118 BC to 5 AD, an average of 220,000,000 coins a year.

The widespread circulation of coin cash allowed successful merchants to invest money in land, empowering the very social class the government attempted to suppress through heavy commercial and property taxes. Emperor Wu even enacted laws which banned registered merchants from owning land, yet powerful merchants were able to avoid registration and own large tracts of land.

The small landowner-cultivators formed the majority of the Han tax base; this revenue was threatened during the latter half of Eastern Han when many peasants fell into debt and were forced to work as farming tenants for wealthy landlords. The Han government enacted reforms in order to keep small landowner-cultivators out of debt and on their own farms. These reforms included reducing taxes, temporary remissions of taxes, granting loans, and providing landless peasants temporary lodging and work in agricultural colonies until they could recover from their debts.

In 168 BC, the land tax rate was reduced from one-fifteenth of a farming household's crop yield to one-thirtieth, and later to a one-hundredth of a crop yield for the last decades of the dynasty. The consequent loss of government revenue was compensated for by increasing property taxes.

The labor tax took the form of conscripted labor for one month per year, which was imposed upon male commoners aged fifteen to fifty-six. This could be avoided in Eastern Han with a commutable tax, since hired labor became more popular.

Private manufacture and government monopolies

In the early Western Han, a wealthy salt or iron industrialist, whether a semi-autonomous king or wealthy merchant, could boast funds that rivaled the imperial treasury and amass a peasant workforce of over a thousand. This kept many peasants away from their farms and denied the government a significant portion of its land tax revenue. To eliminate the influence of such private entrepreneurs, Emperor Wu nationalized the salt and iron industries in 117 BC and allowed many of the former industrialists to become officials administering the state monopolies. By Eastern Han times, the central government monopolies were repealed in favor of production by commandery and county administrations, as well as private businessmen.

Liquor was another profitable private industry nationalized by the central government in 98 BC. However, this was repealed in 81 BC and a property tax rate of two coins for every 0.2 L (0.05 gallons) was levied for those who traded it privately. By 110 BC Emperor Wu also interfered with the profitable trade in grain when he eliminated speculation by selling government-stored grain at a lower price than that demanded by merchants. Apart from Emperor Ming's creation of a short-lived Office for Price Adjustment and Stabilization, which was abolished in 68 AD, central-government price control regulations were largely absent during the Eastern Han.

Science and technology

The Han dynasty was a unique period in the development of premodern Chinese science and technology, comparable to the level of scientific and technological growth during the Song dynasty (960–1279).

Writing materials
In the 1st millennium BC, typical ancient Chinese writing materials were bronzewares, animal bones, and bamboo slips or wooden boards. By the beginning of the Han dynasty, the chief writing materials were clay tablets, silk cloth, hemp paper, and rolled scrolls made from bamboo strips sewn together with hempen string; these were passed through drilled holes and secured with clay stamps.

The oldest known Chinese piece of hempen paper dates to the 2nd century BC. The standard papermaking process was invented by Cai Lun (AD 50–121) in 105. The oldest known surviving piece of paper with writing on it was found in the ruins of a Han watchtower that had been abandoned in AD 110, in Inner Mongolia.

Metallurgy and agriculture

Evidence suggests that blast furnaces, that convert raw iron ore into pig iron, which can be remelted in a cupola furnace to produce cast iron by means of a cold blast and hot blast, were operational in China by the late Spring and Autumn period (722–481 BC). The bloomery was nonexistent in ancient China; however, the Han-era Chinese produced wrought iron by injecting excess oxygen into a furnace and causing decarburization. Cast iron and pig iron could be converted into wrought iron and steel using a fining process.

The Han dynasty Chinese used bronze and iron to make a range of weapons, culinary tools, carpenters' tools, and domestic wares. A significant product of these improved iron-smelting techniques was the manufacture of new agricultural tools. The three-legged iron seed drill, invented by the 2nd century BC, enabled farmers to carefully plant crops in rows instead of casting seeds out by hand. The heavy moldboard iron plow, also invented during the Han dynasty, required only one man to control it with two oxen to pull it. It had three plowshares, a seed box for the drills, a tool which turned down the soil and could sow roughly 45,730 m2 (11.3 acres) of land in a single day.

To protect crops from wind and drought, the grain intendant Zhao Guo (趙過) created the alternating fields system (daitianfa 代田法) during Emperor Wu's reign. This system switched the positions of furrows and ridges between growing seasons. Once experiments with this system yielded successful results, the government officially sponsored it and encouraged peasants to use it. Han farmers also used the pit field system ( 凹田) for growing crops, which involved heavily fertilized pits that did not require plows or oxen and could be placed on sloping terrain. In the southern and small parts of central Han-era China, paddy fields were chiefly used to grow rice, while farmers along the Huai River used transplantation methods of rice production.

Structural and geotechnical engineering

Timber was the chief building material during the Han dynasty; it was used to build palace halls, multi-story residential towers and halls, and single-story houses. Because wood decays rapidly, the only remaining evidence of Han wooden architecture is a collection of scattered ceramic roof tiles. The oldest surviving wooden halls in China date to the Tang dynasty (AD 618–907). Architectural historian Robert L. Thorp points out the scarcity of Han-era archeological remains, and claims that often unreliable Han-era literary and artistic sources are used by historians for clues about lost Han architecture.

Though Han wooden structures decayed, some Han-dynasty ruins made of brick, stone, and rammed earth remain intact. This includes stone pillar-gates, brick tomb chambers, rammed-earth city walls, rammed-earth and brick beacon towers, rammed-earth sections of the Great Wall, rammed-earth platforms where elevated halls once stood, and two rammed-earth castles in Gansu. The ruins of rammed-earth walls that once surrounded the capitals Chang'an and Luoyang still stand, along with their drainage systems of brick arches, ditches, and ceramic water pipes. Monumental stone pillar-gates, twenty-nine of which survive from the Han period, formed entrances of walled enclosures at shrine and tomb sites. These pillars feature artistic imitations of wooden and ceramic building components such as roof tiles, eaves, and balustrades.

The courtyard house is the most common type of home portrayed in Han artwork. Ceramic architectural models of buildings, like houses and towers, were found in Han tombs, perhaps to provide lodging for the dead in the afterlife. These provide valuable clues about lost wooden architecture. The artistic designs found on ceramic roof tiles of tower models are in some cases exact matches to Han roof tiles found at archeological sites.

Over ten Han-era underground tombs have been found, many of them featuring archways, vaulted chambers, and domed roofs. Underground vaults and domes did not require buttress supports since they were held in place by earthen pits. The use of brick vaults and domes in aboveground Han structures is unknown.

From Han literary sources, it is known that wooden-trestle beam bridges, arch bridges, simple suspension bridges, and floating pontoon bridges existed in Han China. However, there are only two known references to arch bridges in Han literature, and only a single Han relief sculpture in Sichuan depicts an arch bridge.

Borehole drilling and derricks were used to lift brine to iron pans where it was distilled into salt. The distillation furnaces were heated by natural gas funneled to the surface through bamboo pipelines. These boreholes perhaps reached a depth of 600 m (2000 ft).

Mechanical and hydraulic engineering
Han-era mechanical engineering comes largely from the choice observational writings of sometimes-disinterested Confucian scholars who generally considered scientific and engineering endeavors to be far beneath them. Professional artisan-engineers (jiang 匠) did not leave behind detailed records of their work. Han scholars, who often had little or no expertise in mechanical engineering, sometimes provided insufficient information on the various technologies they described. Nevertheless, some Han literary sources provide crucial information. 

For example, in 15 BC the philosopher and poet Yang Xiong described the invention of the belt drive for a quilling machine, which was of great importance to early textile manufacturing. The inventions of mechanical engineer and craftsman Ding Huan are mentioned in the Miscellaneous Notes on the Western Capital. Around AD 180, Ding created a manually operated rotary fan used for air conditioning within palace buildings. Ding also used gimbals as pivotal supports for one of his incense burners and invented the world's first known zoetrope lamp.

Modern archeology has led to the discovery of Han artwork portraying inventions which were otherwise absent in Han literary sources. As observed in Han miniature tomb models, but not in literary sources, the crank handle was used to operate the fans of winnowing machines that separated grain from chaff. The odometer cart, invented during the Han period, measured journey lengths, using mechanical figures banging drums and gongs to indicate each distance traveled. This invention is depicted in Han artwork by the 2nd century, yet detailed written descriptions were not offered until the 3rd century. 

Modern archeologists have also unearthed specimens of devices used during the Han dynasty, for example a pair of sliding metal calipers used by craftsmen for making minute measurements. These calipers contain inscriptions of the exact day and year they were manufactured. These tools are not mentioned in any Han literary sources.

The waterwheel appeared in Chinese records during the Han. As mentioned by Huan Tan about AD 20, they were used to turn gears that lifted iron trip hammers, and were used in pounding, threshing, and polishing grain. However, there is no sufficient evidence for the watermill in China until about the 5th century. The Nanyang Commandery Administrator, mechanical engineer, and metallurgist Du Shi (d. 38 AD) created a waterwheel-powered reciprocator that worked the bellows for the smelting of iron. Waterwheels were also used to power chain pumps that lifted water to raised irrigation ditches. The chain pump was first mentioned in China by the philosopher Wang Chong in his 1st-century Balanced Discourse.

The armillary sphere, a three-dimensional representation of the movements in the celestial sphere, was invented in Han China by the 1st century BC. Using a water clock, waterwheel, and a series of gears, the Court Astronomer Zhang Heng (AD 78–139) was able to mechanically rotate his metal-ringed armillary sphere. To address the problem of slowed timekeeping in the pressure head of the inflow water clock, Zhang was the first in China to install an additional tank between the reservoir and inflow vessel. 

Zhang also invented a device he termed an "earthquake weathervane" ( 候風地動儀), which the British biochemist, sinologist, and historian Joseph Needham described as "the ancestor of all seismographs". This device was able to detect the exact cardinal or ordinal direction of earthquakes from hundreds of kilometers away. It employed an inverted pendulum that, when disturbed by ground tremors, would trigger a set of gears that dropped a metal ball from one of eight dragon mouths (representing all eight directions) into a metal toad's mouth.

The account of this device in the Book of the Later Han describes how, on one occasion, one of the metal balls was triggered without any of the observers feeling a disturbance. Several days later, a messenger arrived bearing news that an earthquake had struck in Longxi Commandery (in modern Gansu Province), the direction the device had indicated, which forced the officials at court to admit the efficacy of Zhang's device.

Mathematics

Three Han mathematical treatises still exist. These are the Book on Numbers and Computation, the Arithmetical Classic of the Gnomon and the Circular Paths of Heaven, and the Nine Chapters on the Mathematical Art. Han-era mathematical achievements include solving problems with right-angle triangles, square roots, cube roots, and matrix methods, finding more accurate approximations for pi, providing mathematical proof of the Pythagorean theorem, use of the decimal fraction, Gaussian elimination to solve linear equations, and continued fractions to find the roots of equations.

One of the Han's greatest mathematical advancements was the world's first use of negative numbers. Negative numbers first appeared in the Nine Chapters on the Mathematical Art as black counting rods, where positive numbers were represented by red counting rods. Negative numbers were also used by the Greek mathematician Diophantus around AD 275, and in the 7th-century Bakhshali manuscript of Gandhara, South Asia, but were not widely accepted in Europe until the 16th century.

The Han applied mathematics to various diverse disciplines. In musical tuning, Jing Fang (78–37 BC) realized that 53 perfect fifths was approximate to 31 octaves while creating a musical scale of 60 tones, calculating the difference at 177147⁄176776 (the same value of 53 equal temperament discovered by the German mathematician Nicholas Mercator [1620–1687], i.e. 353/284).

Astronomy

Mathematics were essential in drafting the astronomical calendar, a lunisolar calendar that used the Sun and Moon as time-markers throughout the year. During the spring and autumn periods of the 5th century BC, the Chinese established the Sifen calendar (古四分历), which measured the tropical year at 365.25 days. However, Emperor Zhang later reinstated the Sifen calendar.

Han Chinese astronomers made star catalogues and detailed records of comets that appeared in the night sky, including recording the 12 BC appearance of the comet now known as Halley's Comet.

Han dynasty astronomers adopted a geocentric model of the universe, theorizing that it was shaped like a sphere surrounding the earth in the center. They assumed that the Sun, Moon, and planets were spherical and not disc-shaped. They also thought that the illumination of the Moon and planets was caused by sunlight, that lunar eclipses occurred when the Earth obstructed sunlight falling onto the Moon, and that a solar eclipse occurred when the Moon obstructed sunlight from reaching the Earth. Although others disagreed with his model, Wang Chong accurately described the water cycle of the evaporation of water into clouds.

Cartography, ships, and vehicles
Evidence found in Chinese literature, and archeological evidence, show that cartography existed in China before the Han. Some of the earliest Han maps discovered were ink-penned silk maps found amongst the Mawangdui Silk Texts in a 2nd-century-BC tomb. The general Ma Yuan created the world's first known raised-relief map from rice in the 1st century. This date could be revised if the tomb of Emperor Qin Shi Huang is excavated and the account in the Records of the Grand Historian concerning a model map of the empire is proven to be true.

Although the use of the graduated scale and grid reference for maps was not thoroughly described until the published work of Pei Xiu (AD 224–271), there is evidence that in the early 2nd century, cartographer Zhang Heng was the first to use scales and grids for maps.

Han dynasty Chinese sailed in a variety of ships different from those of previous eras, such as the tower ship. The junk design was developed and realized during the Han era. Junk ships featured a square-ended bow and stern, a flat-bottomed hull or carvel-shaped hull with no keel or sternpost, and solid transverse bulkheads in the place of structural ribs found in Western vessels. Moreover, Han ships were the first in the world to be steered using a rudder at the stern, in contrast to the simpler steering oar used for riverine transport, allowing them to sail on the high seas.

Although ox-carts and chariots were previously used in China, the wheelbarrow was first used in Han China in the 1st century BC. Han artwork of horse-drawn chariots shows that the Warring-States-Era heavy wooden yoke placed around a horse's chest was replaced by the softer breast strap. Later, during the Northern Wei (386–534), the fully developed horse collar was invented.

Medicine

Han-era medical physicians believed that the human body was subject to the same forces of nature that governed the greater universe, namely the cosmological cycles of yin and yang and the five phases. Each organ of the body was associated with a particular phase. Illness was viewed as a sign that qi or "vital energy" channels leading to a certain organ had been disrupted. Thus, Han-era physicians prescribed medicine that was believed to counteract this imbalance. 

For example, since the wood phase was believed to promote the fire phase, medicinal ingredients associated with the wood phase could be used to heal an organ associated with the fire phase. Besides dieting, Han physicians also prescribed moxibustion, acupuncture, and calisthenics as methods of maintaining one's health. When surgery was performed by the Chinese physician Hua Tuo (d. AD 208), he used anesthesia to numb his patients' pain and prescribed a rubbing ointment that allegedly sped the process of healing surgical wounds. Whereas the physician Zhang Zhongjing ( – ) is known to have written the Shanghan lun ("Dissertation on Typhoid Fever"), it is thought that both he and Hua Tuo collaborated in compiling the Shennong Ben Cao Jing medical text.

See also 

Battle of Jushi
Campaign against Dong Zhuo
Comparative studies of the Roman and Han empires
Han Emperors family tree
Shuanggudui
Ten Attendants

Notes

References

Citations

Sources cited

 (an abridgement of Joseph Needham's work)

Further reading

External links

Han dynasty by Minnesota State University
Han dynasty art with video commentary, Minneapolis Institute of Arts
Early Imperial China: A Working Collection of Resources  
"Han Culture," Hanyangling Museum Website
The Han Synthesis, BBC Radio 4 discussion with Christopher Cullen, Carol Michaelson & Roel Sterckx (In Our Time, Oct. 14, 2004)

 
States and territories established in the 3rd century BC
States and territories disestablished in the 3rd century
.
.
.
.
200s BC establishments
206 BC
220 disestablishments
3rd-century BC establishments in China
3rd-century disestablishments in China
.
Dynasties in Chinese history
Former countries in Chinese history